The Open Source Software CD was a collection of about 150 open-source programs for Microsoft Windows.  It contained programs for software development, fun and games, Internet, multimedia, productivity, security, text editing, and utilities.

Similar projects include OpenDisc, OpenCD, WinLibre and GNUWin II.

See also

 OpenDisc
 GNUWin II
 WinLibre
 LoLiWin

External links

  Opensource-DVD 2013
  Latest Opensource-DVD iso image

Free software distributions